Mafia Bidness is the debut studio album by American Los Angeles-based hip hop quartet Shoreline Mafia. It was released on July 31, 2020 via Atlantic Records. Production was handled by twelve record producers, including Ron-Ron The Producer, Bruce24k, ACETHEFACE and Helluva. It features guest appearances from 03 Greedo, 1takejay, AFN Peso, Drakeo the Ruler, Duke Deuce, Future, GT, Kodak Black, Lil Yachty, Mike Sherm, Nfant, Q Da Fool, Wiz Khalifa, YG and Z Money.

Release and promotion
In early April 2020, Shoreline Mafia founding member Fenix "Fenix Flexin" Rypinski announced that he would be leaving the group after the release of this album.

The album was promoted by five singles: "Gangstas & Sippas", "Ride Out", "Change Ya Life", "Perc Popper" and "How We Do It". The music video for the album's fifth single was directed by John Rawl and released on July 29, 2020, with the song being released five days earlier on July 24.

Deluxe version of the album was released on November 30, 2020 and it includes eight new tracks.

Track listing

Charts

References

2020 debut albums
Atlantic Records albums
Hip hop albums by American artists